Arantza del Puerto Astiz (born 8 March 1971 in San Sebastián) is a Spanish former football defender. She played throughout her career for Añorga KKE, with which she won three national championships and three national cups between 1990 and 1996. Del Puerto is the second capped player for the Spanish women's national team to date with 71 caps, and she took part in the 1997 European Championship.

After retiring in 2005 she took a coaching licence along with other former players such as Pep Guardiola, Luis Enrique and Luis Milla. She coached the Basque national team in 2008, and she has also managed the women's teams of Zumaiako FT and Real Unión. She currently serves as a member of the Royal Spanish Football Federation's Women's Football Committee.

References

1971 births
Living people
Spanish women's footballers
Spain women's international footballers
Primera División (women) players
Añorga KKE players
Footballers from San Sebastián
Women's association football defenders